The 2020 Stephen F. Austin football team represented  Stephen F. Austin State University in the 2020–21 NCAA Division I FCS football season as a member of the Southland Conference. The Lumberjacks were led by second-year head coach Colby Carthel and played their home games at Homer Bryce Stadium. The team finished 6–4 for the program's first winning season since 2014. All four losses were against NCAA Division I FBS teams.

Preseason

Preseason poll
The Southland Conference released their original preseason poll in July 2020. The Lumberjacks were picked to finish eighth in the conference, prior to their schedule split from the rest of the league. In addition, one Lumberjack was chosen to the Preseason All-Southland Team

(*) These teams opted out of playing in the revised spring 2021 Southland schedule, and instead played as Independent in the fall of 2020.

Preseason All–Southland Teams

Offense

2nd Team
Xavier Gipson – Wide Receiver, SO

Defense

2nd Team
Xavier Gipson – Kick Returner, SO

Schedule
Stephen F. Austin had a game scheduled against Alabama A&M, but was canceled due to the COVID-19 pandemic.

Game summaries

at UTEP

at UTSA

at SMU

West Texas A&M

References

Stephen F. Austin
Stephen F. Austin Lumberjacks football seasons
Stephen F. Austin Lumberjacks football